House of Councillors elections were held in Japan on 27 June 1971, electing half the seats in the House. The Liberal Democratic Party won the most seats.

Results

By constituency

References

Japan
House of Councillors (Japan) elections
1971 elections in Japan
June 1971 events in Asia
Election and referendum articles with incomplete results